Pooja Ruparel is an Indian actress who appears in Bollywood movies and TV series. She is well known for her iconic role as "Chutki" in Dilwale Dulhania Le Jayenge, one of India's most successful films. She has also acted in a number of plays, apart from being a stand-up comedian and a singer.

Early life and education
Pooja Ruparel was born in Mumbai. She is Bhavna Ruparel's sister and Sonakshi Sinha's cousin. She completed her education in Mumbai and holds a master's degree in Industrial Psychology.

Career
Pooja Ruparel started appearing in Bollywood movies as a child artist in 1993. She first appeared in King Uncle starring Jackie Shroff and Shah Rukh Khan, and gained nationwide popularity through her role as "Chutki" in Dilwale Dulhania Le Jayenge. Pooja has also acted in a number of movies and TV series ever since, including Amit Sahani Ki List, X: Past Is Present, 24 (Indian TV series) and Zabaan Sambhalke.

Filmography

Films

Television

Discography

See also
Cinema of India

References

External links
 
 

Indian child actresses
21st-century Indian actresses
1982 births
Living people
Actresses from Mumbai
Actresses in Hindi cinema